

A34 allele frequencies

A*3401

A*3401 when found outside of Africa is primarily found in the South Asia, Austronesia and the South/Central part of the West Pacific Rim (WPR). It appears to have made it to Eastern Taiwan's indigenous tribes (Ami, Yami) but not more north of this region. It has not been detected in any sampling of Japan. Over most of the East Pacific Rim region where it is found it is limited to 1 or 2 common haplotypes in strong linkage disequilibrium. This indicates its presence in the WPR region is the result of recent migrations.

The A*3401 migration from Africa is supported by its presence in East Africa and South Africa and by current models of human migration, this allele was likely represented in the first wave of immigrants. However, in areas were mixtures of these alleles are commonly found, Persian Gulf region and India, A*3401 is relatively uncommon, scarce, or absent. The exception is Saudi Arabia, in which A34 is at 2.8% and among Israeli Jews at 8.8%. Some reports that both A*3401 and A*3402 are in the region, but questionable whether these are perpetually maintained allele frequencies are simply recent migrants.

A*3402

A*3402 is more frequently found in the west, it is found in Iberia and along the mediterranean, but its frequency is low, the exception may be in the Levant, but it
is unclear whether this is A*3401 or A*3402.

A34-B Haplotypes
A34 is in strong linkage disequilibrium in many areas of the world, but particularly
SE Asia and Oceania. The most prominent of these haplotypes is A34-Cw11(1)-B56. 
This haplotype is found from Western Australia to Taiwan to New Zealand indicating a recent
genetic linkage between these peoples.

Another frequently found haplotype is the A34-B61 (A*3401:Cw*04:B*B4002) haplotype. This haplotype has a similar distribution as A34-B56.

These haplotypes indicate that long range/oversees migrations were taking place in Austronesias (late paleolithic) prehistory.

References

3